Jorge Filipe Vidigal (born 29 January 1978) is an Angolan retired footballer who played as a right back.

Club career
Born in Elvas, Portugal, Vidigal played most of his career in the country's lower leagues, representing hometown club O Elvas CAD (two spells), G.D. Estoril Praia, S.C. Olhanense and C.F. União. He also spent two years at Sporting CP, but appeared almost exclusively for its reserves.

Vidigal's only full Primeira Liga experience came with S.C. Beira-Mar, who signed the player from Olhanense – where he also appeared as a defensive midfielder – on a two-year contract. He only appeared in ten matches in his debut season, and the Aveiro team was relegated.

In the summer of 2008, after a brief stint in Madeira with União, Vidigal joined C.R. Caála, returning to the land of his ancestors.

International career
With his older brother Lito as coach, Vidigal earned one international cap for Angola on 27 August 2011, as a substitute in a 2–1 friendly loss to DR Congo in Dundo.

Personal life
Vidigal was the youngest of 13 brothers and sisters, four of his male siblings also being footballers: Beto, Lito – who represented Angola as a player and coach – Luís (played for Sporting and Portugal with success, spent several years in Italy and was coached by Lito at C.F. Estrela da Amadora) and Toni. His nephew, André, was also involved in the sport professionally.

Honours
Sporting
Primeira Liga: 2001–02
Taça de Portugal: 2001–02

References

External links

1978 births
Living people
People from Elvas
Portuguese sportspeople of Angolan descent
Angolan footballers
Portuguese footballers
Association football defenders
Primeira Liga players
Liga Portugal 2 players
Segunda Divisão players
O Elvas C.A.D. players
G.D. Estoril Praia players
Sporting CP B players
Sporting CP footballers
S.C. Olhanense players
S.C. Beira-Mar players
C.F. União players
Girabola players
C.R. Caála players
Angola international footballers
Angolan expatriate footballers
Expatriate footballers in Portugal
Angolan expatriate sportspeople in Portugal
Sportspeople from Portalegre District